Olivia DeMerchant (born February 16, 1991) is a Canadian rugby union player. She represented  at the 2014 Women's Rugby World Cup.

Rugby career 
In 2011, DeMerchant played for the Canadian women's under-20 team.

DeMerchant played four seasons for St. Francis Xavier University where she studied. She subsequently returned, after playing with the Saracens Ladies in 2016–2018, and is currently playing her final year of eligibility in the 2018 season.

DeMerchant was selected in Canada's squad for the 2021 Rugby World Cup in New Zealand.

Canadian Football
Demerchant began playing women's tackle football with the Capital Area Lady Gladiators of the Maritime Women's Football League in 2015. She dominated on both offense and defense from the running back and defensive end positions. She earned a Maritime Women's Football League Offensive All-Star award and 2015 Offense Player of the Year with the Lady Gladiators.

Awards and recognition 

 2019, Rugby Canada Player of the Year (15s).
 2019, Rugby Canada Gillian Florence Award.

References

External links
Rugby Canada Player Profile 

1991 births
Living people
Canadian female rugby union players
Canada women's international rugby union players